is the Japanese version of the board game that is called The Game of Life in North America. Unlike The Game of Life, the player starts in his toddler years and has to go to elementary school, junior high school, and high school before being allowed to either go to university or start his career. However, the board game has been updated numerous times like its North American counterpart. It was released in 1967 by toy company called Takara. It has been enjoyed by Japanese boys and girls for generations.

The game has been adapted for the Famicom, the Super Famicom, the Game Boy, the Saturn, the PlayStation, the Nintendo 64, the Game Boy Color, the Dreamcast, the Game Boy Advance, the PlayStation 2, the GameCube, the Nintendo DS and the Wii. Most of them are considered to be electronic board games while RPG Jinsei Game functions more like a role playing game with a post-industrial theme.

Video game adaptations

Famicom
 Bakushou!! Jinsei Gekijou (1988)
 Bakushou!! Star Monomane Shittenou (1990)
 Bakushou!! Jinsei Gekijou 2 (1991)
 Bakushou!! Jinsei Gekijou 3 (1991)
 Aa Yakyū Jinsei Itchokusen (1992)
 RPG Jinsei Game (1993)

Super Famicom
 Daibakushou Jinsei Gekijou - Dokidoki Seishun (1993)
 Daibakushou Jinsei Gekijou - Ooedo Nikki (1994)
 Super Jinsei Game (1994)
 Super Jinsei Game 2 (1995)
 Super Jinsei Game 3 (1996)

Game Boy
 Jinsei Game Densetsu (1991)
 Jinsei Game (1995)

Sega Saturn
 DX Jinsei Game (1995)
 DX Jinsei Game II (1997)

PlayStation
 DX Jinsei Game (1996)
 DX Jinsei Game II (1997)
 Sakumashiki Jinsei Game (1998)
 Quiz Darakeno Jinsei Game (1999)
 DX Jinsei Game III (1999)
 Oshigoto-shiki Jinsei Game: Mezase Shokugyou King (2000)
 DX Jinsei Game IV (2001)
 Quiz Darakeno Jinsei Game Dai-2-kai! (2002)
 DX Jinsei Game V (2002)

Nintendo 64
 Bakushō Jinsei 64: Mezase! Resort Ō (1998)
 Jinsei Game 64 (1999)

Game Boy Color
 DX Jinsei Game
 Jinsei Game Tomodachi Takusan Tsukurou yo! (1999)

Dreamcast
 Jinsei Game for Dreamcast (2000)

Game Boy Advance
 Jinsei Game Advance (2002)

Playstation 2
 EX Jinsei Game (2002)
 EX Jinsei Game II (2003)
 New Jinsei Game (2004)

GameCube
 Special Jinsei Game (2003)

Nintendo DS
 Jinsei Game DS (2006)
 Jinsei Game Q DS: Heisei no Dekigoto (2007)
 Jinsei Game Q DS: Showa no Dekigoto (2007)
 Jinsei Game (2009)

Wii
 Jinsei Game Wii (2007)
 Jinsei Game Wii EX (2008)
 Jinsei Game: Happy Family (2010)
 Jinsei Game Happy Family Gotouchi Neta Zouryou Shiage (2011)

WiiWare
 Jinsei Game (2009)
 Jinsei Game: Happy Step (2010)

See also
 Bakushou!! Jinsei Gekijou series
 Super Jinsei Game series

Takara Tomy franchises
Hasbro franchises
Roll-and-move board games
Japanese games